Fidesz – Hungarian Civic Alliance is a right-wing populist and national-conservative political party in Hungary, led by Viktor Orbán.

It was formed in 1988 under the name of Alliance of Young Democrats as a centre-left and liberal activist movement that opposed the ruling Marxist–Leninist government. It was registered as a political party in 1990, with Orbán as its leader. It entered the National Assembly following the 1990 parliamentary election, although, it lost two seats after the 1994 election. Following the election, it adopted liberal-conservatism which caused liberal members to leave and to join the Alliance of Free Democrats. It then sought to form a connection with other conservative parties, and after the 1998 election, it successfully formed a centre-right government. It adopted nationalism in the early 2000s, but its popularity slightly declined due to corruption scandals. It served in the opposition between 2002 and 2010, and in 2006 it formed a coalition with the Christian Democratic People's Party.

The Őszöd speech which was followed by mass protests restored its popularity, which led Fidesz to winning a supermajority in the 2010 election. After returning to governing Hungary, it adopted national-conservative policies and shifted further to the right. It also became more critical of the European Union, which led to the party being described as eurosceptic. In 2011, the new Hungarian constitution was adopted in the parliament and in 2012 it became effective, although it was subject to controversies due to its consolidation of power to Fidesz. Its majority of seats remained after the 2014 election, and following the escalation of the migrant crisis, Fidesz began using right-wing populist and anti-immigrant rhetoric. Since its inception, its political position has changed drastically, and Fidesz is now positioned as a right-wing or far-right party. Political scientists have described the party's governance as illiberal or authoritarian, with Orbán describing their model of government as "Christian illiberal democracy".

Following the 2022 Hungarian parliamentary election, it currently holds a majority in the National Assembly with 135 seats. It has also held the presidency since 2010, has endorsed the election of every president since 2000, and it enjoys majorities in all 19 county legislatures, while being in opposition in the General Assembly of Budapest. Fidesz was initially a member of the Liberal International until 2000, after which it joined the European People's Party. It remained its member until 2021, and since then it has served with the Non-Inscrits group within the European Parliament.

History

1988–1989: Liberal activist beginnings 
The party was founded in the spring of 1988 and named Fiatal Demokraták Szövetsége (Alliance of Young Democrats) with the acronym FIDESZ. It grew out of an underground liberal student activist movement opposed to the ruling Hungarian Socialist Workers' Party. Founding such a movement was semi-illegal at the time, so the founders risked their careers by being involved in the opposition. The membership had an upper age limit of 35 years (this requirement was abolished at the 1993 party congress).

In 1989, Fidesz won the Rafto Prize. The movement was represented at the award ceremony by one of its leaders, Péter Molnár, who later became a Member of Parliament in Hungary.

1990–1998: Centre-left opposition and conservative turn 
In the 1990 elections the party entered the National Assembly after winning about 6% of the vote. They became a small, though quite popular oppositional party. In 1992, Fidesz joined the Liberal International. At the time, it was a moderate liberal centrist party, sometimes also described as left-liberal.

At the 1993 party congress it changed its political position from liberal to civic-centrist ("polgári centrumpárt"). The turn in ideology caused a severe split in the membership. Péter Molnár left the party along with Gábor Fodor and Klára Ungár, who joined the liberal Alliance of Free Democrats. Viktor Orbán was elected party chairman.

After its disappointing result in the 1994 elections, Fidesz remained an opposition party but grew increasingly conservative. In 1995, it changed its name to Hungarian Civic Party (Magyar Polgári Párt) and sought connections to the national-conservative Hungarian Democratic Forum, a former governing party.

1998–2002: First Orbán government 
Fidesz gained power for the first time at the 1998 elections, with Viktor Orbán becoming prime minister. Their coalition partners were the smaller Hungarian Democratic Forum and the Independent Smallholders' Party. In 2000, Fidesz terminated its membership in the Liberal International and joined the European People's Party. The government constituted a "relatively conventional European conservative" rule.

2002–2010: Return to opposition 

Fidesz narrowly lost the 2002 elections to the Hungarian Socialist Party, garnering 41.07% to the Socialists' 42.05%. Fidesz had 169 members of the Hungarian National Assembly, out of a total of 386. Immediately after the election, they accused the opponents of electoral fraud. The 2002 Hungarian municipal elections saw again huge Fidesz losses.

In the spring of 2003, Fidesz took its current name, Fidesz – Hungarian Civic Union.

It was the most successful party in the 2004 European Parliamentary Elections: it won 47.4% of the vote and 12 of its candidates were elected as Members of the European Parliament (MEPs), including Lívia Járóka, the second Romani MEP.

Fidesz's nominee, Dr. László Sólyom, was elected President of Hungary in the 2005 election. He was endorsed by Védegylet, an NGO including people from the whole political spectrum. A self-described "conservative liberal," he championed elements of both political wings with a selective, but conscious choice of values.

In 2005, Fidesz and the Christian Democratic People's Party (KDNP) formed an alliance for the 2006 elections, which were won by the social-democratic and liberal coalition of Hungarian Socialist Party (MSZP) and the Alliance of Free Democrats (SZDSZ). Fidesz received 42% of the list votes and 164 of 386 representatives in the National Assembly.

On 1 October 2006 Fidesz won the municipal elections, which counterbalanced the MSZP-led government's power to some extent. Fidesz won 15 of 23 mayoralties in Hungary's largest cities—although its candidate narrowly lost the city of Budapest to a member of the Liberal Party—and majorities in 18 out of 20 regional assemblies.

In the 2009 European Parliament election, Fidesz won a landslide victory, gaining 56.36% of the vote and 14 of Hungary's 22 seats.

In a closed-door party meeting in 2009, Orbán called for a "central political forcefield" to govern Hungary for up to 20 years to achieve political stability.

In January 2010, László Kövér, head of the party's national board, told reporters the party was aiming at winning a two-thirds majority at the parliamentary elections in April. He noted that Fidesz had a realistic chance to win a landslide. However, this feat was threatened by the rise of the radical nationalist Jobbik party. Kövér said it was a "lamentably negative" tendency, adding that it was rooted in the "disaster government" of the Socialist Party and its former liberal ally Free Democrats.

2010–present: In power 
The strong and preeminent Fidesz has benefited from the fragmented and disjointed opposition that has proved inept at mounting a unified challenge to the ruling party in a country where a majority of parliamentary seats are allocated to the party that garners the plurality of votes in a constituency.

Government debt has fallen by 6% in the 8 years after Fidesz took power in 2010 while the country's credit ratings have improved. Economic growth had almost quadrupled with wages rising by over 10% and destitution decreasing by almost 50% (though still considerable). According to official figures, unemployment had fallen by nearly two-thirds. However, as many as almost half of newly employed Hungarians had found work elsewhere in the EU. A public works program has also been criticized by some economists for artificially and deceptively reducing unemployment numbers while engaging in and compensating people for possibly unneeded or unnecessarily inefficient work. Hungary has been highly dependent on EU funds during Fidesz's rule; these representing nearly 4% of the country's GDP, more than for any other EU member.

2010–2014: Second Orbán government 
In a landslide victory in the 2010 parliamentary elections, the party won an outright majority in the first round on 11 April, with the Fidesz-KDNP alliance winning 206 seats, including 119 individual seats. In the final result, Fidesz 263 seats, of which 173 are individual seats. Fidesz held 227 of these seats, giving it an outright majority in the National Assembly by itself.

Fidesz was widely seen as propelled to a sweeping victory in large part due to the dissatisfaction with the ruling political establishment which was plagued by corruption scandals and suffered a further blow by the global financial crisis. The Socialist government had also imposed harsh austerity measures in an attempt to reign in its ballooning budget deficits even before the global crisis. In September 2006, a recording of the prime minister admitting to lying about the country's dire economic prospects was revealed by the media and broadcast on radio. Steel barriers were erected around Parliament to protect it from tens of thousands of protesters.

After winning 53% of the popular vote in the first-round of the 2010 parliamentary election, which translated into a supermajority of 68% of parliamentary seats, giving Fidesz sufficient power to revise or replace the constitution, the party embarked on an extraordinary project of passing over 200 laws and drafting and adopting a new constitution—since followed by nearly 2000 amendments.

The new constitution has been widely criticized by the Venice Commission for Democracy through Law, the Council of Europe, the European Parliament and the United States for concentrating too much power in the hands of the ruling party, for limiting oversight of the new constitution by the Constitutional Court of Hungary, and for removing democratic checks and balances in various areas, including the ordinary judiciary, supervision of elections, and the media.

In October 2013 Thorbjørn Jagland, Secretary General of the Council of Europe said that the Council were satisfied with the amendments which had been made to the criticized laws.

2014–2018: Third Orbán government 
Fidesz won the nationwide parliamentary election in April 2014 and secured a second supermajority with 133 seats (of 199) in the legislature. This supermajority was lost, however, when Tibor Navracsics was appointed to the European Commission. His Veszprém county seat was taken by an independent candidate in a by-election. Another by-election on 12 April 2015 saw the supermajority lose a second seat, also in Veszprém, to a Jobbik candidate.

2018–2022: Fourth Orbán government 
Fidesz won the nationwide parliamentary election in April 2018 and secured a 3rd supermajority with 133 seats (of 199) in the legislature. Orbán and Fidesz campaigned primarily on the issues of immigration and foreign meddling, and the election was seen as a victory for right-wing populism in Europe.

With the start of 2019, the prime minister's residence was relocated from the Hungarian Parliament Building to the Buda Castle, a former Carmelite monastery and former royal residence. The move was first planned in 2002 during the first Fidesz government, but was never carried out. Government representatives stated the move was necessary to uphold the separation of the executive and legislative branch by physically separating the two (in contrast to the Communist era when the two branches operated in the same building) while the opposition criticized the move as profligate (the renovation cost Ft21bn, or €65.5M) and as a symbolic revival of the Horthy era (Miklós Horthy also took up residence in the building).

In 2019 local elections, the party lost its majority in General Assembly of Budapest and numerous city councils.

2022–present: Fifth Orbán government 
Fidesz won the 2022 Hungarian parliamentary election and secured a 3rd supermajority for the 4th time with 135 seats (of 199) in the legislature. Reuters described it as a "crushing victory". 

With 54.13% of the popular vote, Fidesz received the highest vote share by any party since Hungary returned to democracy in 1989.

Ideology and policies
Fidesz's position on the political spectrum has changed over time. At its inception as a student movement in the late 1980s, the party was positioned on the centre-left on the political spectrum, and it advocated for liberalism and libertarianism. It was strongly committed towards anti-clerical and secular policies. As the Hungarian political landscape crystallized following the fall of Communism and the first free elections, Fidesz moved to the right in 1994. Although Fidesz was in opposition to the Hungarian Democratic Forum's national-conservative coalition government from 1990 to 1994, Fidesz was the most prominent liberal-conservative political force in Hungary by 1998. It adopted nationalism, national-liberalism, and Christian democracy in the early 2000s. It was positioned on the centre-right, although it moved more to the right as the decade progressed.

Fidesz is currently a right-wing party, and it is national conservative while favouring interventionist policies on economic issues like handling of banks, and has a strong conservative stance on social issues, a soft Eurosceptic vision towards European integration, and has been described as right-wing populist. In the late 2010s, the party has increasingly been described as far-right; its ruling style has also been variously described as "soft fascism", "soft dictatorship", and "soft autocracy". The Fidesz party has denied such accusations and distanced itself from the extreme right, criticising such accusations as politically motivated opposition to its anti-immigrant policies and pursuit of illiberal democracy.

Illiberal democracy 

Orbán and other Fidesz politicians have prominently described their model of government as a Christian illiberal democracy.

Orbán has described liberal democracy as having undemocratic characteristics because of "being intolerant of alternative views", and being incompatible with and antithetical to Christian democracy (saying: "Christian democracy is, by definition, not liberal: it is, if you like, illiberal."), and praised Turkey, Russia, China, and Singapore as successful examples of illiberal states.

Economy 

Like the Hungarian right in general, Fidesz has been more skeptical of the neoliberal economic policies than the Hungarian left. According to researchers, the elites of the Hungarian left (the Hungarian Socialist Party and the former Alliance of Free Democrats) have been differentiated from the right by being more supportive of the classical liberal economic policies, while the right (especially extreme right) has advocated more economic interventionist policies. In contrast, on issues like church and state and family policies, the liberals show alignment along the traditional left–right spectrum. In the past, Fidesz has implemented several economic liberal policies, including an income flat tax, reductions in the corporate tax rate, restrictions on unemployment benefits, and privatisation of state-owned land.

The Fidesz government has embraced some government schemes, including "public works job program, pension hikes, utility bill cuts, a minimum wage increase and cash gifts for retirees." It has also implemented a national public works program aimed in particular at assisting neglected rural communities. It has sought national control of key economic sectors while assuming a cautious stance on economic globalisation.

Foreign policy

European Union 
Despite the conflict with the European People's Party and European Union (EU) institutions, Fidesz and the Orbán government have claimed to be not in conflict with, but purportedly in line with pan-European values. As he struggled to maintain rapport with the EPP, Orbán began forming a right-wing populist alliance to electorally challenge the conservative EU establishment despite voicing a desire for Fidesz to remain a member. Orbán and his government have clashed with the EU over the handling of the European migrant crisis and the death penalty, which is prohibited by EU rules.

Russia and Ukraine 
Hungary was the only EU member state to vote against financial aid for Ukraine during its conflict with Russia-sponsored separatists, and has been a vocal critic of EU sanctions against Russia for its actions in Ukraine. The main cause is that since 2017, relations with Ukraine rapidly deteriorated over the issue of the Hungarian minority in Ukraine. Hungary has been obstructing Ukraine's integration efforts in the EU and NATO, even though Hungary has also been continuously helping and supporting Ukraine, with an exceptional attention to Transcarpathia. Orbán has strongly criticized EU sanctions against Russia but abstained from vetoing them. The Fidesz government joined the UK-led diplomatic offensive after the Skripal poisoning, expelling Russian embassy officials. Orbán has hailed Russia as an exemplary case of illiberal democracy.

During his presidency, Orbán has been described as drawing closer to Russian president Vladimir Putin. The closer relationship between the two leaders and nations has however largely been motivated by a tighter economic relationship, part of the government's "Eastern Opening" strategy, announced in 2011.

The Fourth Orbán Government initially strongly condemned the 2022 Russian invasion of Ukraine, aligning the country with NATO and the European Union on the matter: Orbán announced that Hungary would be sending humanitarian aid to Ukraine, but denied sending military equipment. President János Áder (also a Fidesz member) strongly condemned the Russian invasion, comparing it to the 1956 Soviet invasion of Hungary. However, Fidesz soon realigned with his formerly pro-Russian position: the party repeatedly opposed sanctions against the Russian Federation, promting international press to describe Orbán as "a key Putin's ally".

Immigration 
Fidesz has adopted anti-immigration stances and rhetoric. The Fidesz government has conversely begun admitting increasing numbers of foreign workers due to a labour shortage resulting from strong economic growth, population decline, and rising wages.

Nativism 
In a 2018 address, Orbán said: "We must state that we do not want to be diverse and do not want to be mixed: we do not want our own colour, traditions and national culture to be mixed with those of others. We do not want this. We do not want that at all. We do not want to be a diverse country." Orbán has "often expressed a preference for a racially homogeneous society." The government has modified the country's Constitution to make it illegal to "settle foreign populations in Hungary."

Despite a very low fertility rate that has led to a demographic deficit, the Fidesz government has remained steadfastly opposed to economic immigration that has been harnessed by other European countries to relieve its worker deficits. Instead, the government announced pecuniary incentives (including eliminating taxes for mothers with more than 3 children, and reducing credit payments and easier access to government-subsidized mortgages), and expanding day care and kindergarten access. The Fidesz government's child incentive program also offers a 10-million-forint government-subsidized zero-interest loan to married couples who are willing to have a baby after 1 July 2019.

Social policy 
Changes passed by the Fidesz government have given citizens the right to use arms for self-defense on one's own property. Fidesz has passed legislation criminalising homelessness.

Christianity 
Orbán has on multiple occasions emphasized upholding Christian values as central to his government, and has described his government as creating a Christian democracy. Hungarian Catholic bishop András Veres described some of Fidesz' policies, such as the of providing free IVF treatment for couples at state-run clinics, as being at odds with some Christian denominations, particularly the Roman Catholic Church, which opposes IVF. Orbán is a member of the Reformed Church in Hungary.

Other

Anti-communism 
The party is anti-communist. In May 2018, the President of the European Commission Jean-Claude Juncker attended and spoke at a celebration of the deceased Karl Marx's 200th birthday, where he defended Marx's legacy. In response, MEPs from Fidesz wrote: "Marxist ideology led to the death of tens of millions and ruined the lives of hundreds of millions. The celebration of its founder is a mockery of their memory."

The Fidesz government spokesman Zoltán Kovács justified the government's controversial policies as an effort to "get rid of the remnants of communism that are still with us, not only in terms of institutions but in terms of mentality."

During the party's rule, statues of communists regarded as traitors have been removed with Fidesz politicians in attendance. In December 2018, Hungarian authorities removed a statue of Imre Nagy for renovation. Nagy was a Hungarian reformist communist politician who led the failed anti-Soviet 1956 Hungarian Revolution and was later executed for his role in the uprising; the statue was replaced with a memorial dedicated to the victims of the short-lived 1919 Hungarian Soviet Republic.

National Consultations and political informational campaigns 
The government has often propagated Fidesz's political ideas in tax-funded advertisements, putting up posters portraying a grinning George Soros, while calling on the citizens to oppose his purported support of illegal immigration (many of the posters portraying Soros, who is Jewish, were defaced with antisemitic graffiti), posters depicting Soros and European Commission head Jean-Claude Juncker laughing together with text suggesting Soros' control of EU institutions (while also disseminating the accusation by letters sent to all Hungarian citizens), and posters using the stock photo featuring photo models from the "distracted boyfriend" internet meme to promote family values. Additionally, various party members have been accused of antisemitism.

The government has employed so-called National Consultations, sending questionnaires to citizens that survey their opinions on government policy and legislation while pushing the Fidesz governments' ideology and agenda with suggestive questions (e.g. by referring to a supposed "Soros plan" to "convince Brussels to resettle at least one million immigrants from Africa and the Middle East annually on the territory of the European Union, including Hungary", that this "is part of the Soros plan to launch political attacks on countries objecting to immigration and impose strict penalties on them", and asking citizens whether they agree, or blasting "Brussels bureaucrats" in a consultation about family policy). On other occasions, such as just prior to elections, the government sent letters notifying citizens that it will reduce their gas payments by €38, or sent pensioners gift vouchers. The Fidesz government has also carried out taxpayer-funded "information campaigns", or "national messaging initiatives", that have denounced supposed enemies of Hungary with budgets of tens of millions of euros per year.

Youth wing

In December 2005 the Congress of Fidesz established the Fidesz Youth Section ("Fidelitas") as a division within the party gathering all members below the age of 30. The chairman of Fidesz Youth Section was Dániel Loppert until 2011. The current chairman is Áron Veress. The Fidesz Youth Section is member of European Democrat Students (EDS) and observer member in the Democrat Youth Community of Europe (DEMYC).

International affiliations 
Fidesz was a member of the Liberal International from 1992 to 2000, and is currently a member of the International Democratic Union and Centrist Democrat International.

European Union

Following its ideological turn to conservatism, it joined the centre-right European People's Party (EPP) but was suspended on 20 March 2019. Fidesz MEPs left the European People's Party group in the European Parliament on 3 March 2021, after the EPP changed its rules to allow it to expel a party's entire delegation. It has served with the Non-Inscrits since then.

In July 2021, Fidesz signed a joint declaration with National Rally, Law and Justice, Vox, the League, the Brothers of Italy, the Estonian Conservative People's Party, the Freedom Party of Austria, Belgium's Vlaams Belang, the Danish People's Party, the Finns Party, IMRO – Bulgarian National Movement, Greek Solution, the Romanian Christian Democratic National Peasants' Party and Electoral Action of Poles in Lithuania – Christian Families Alliance on the future of the EU.

In December 2021, the party participated in the Warsaw summit with Law and Justice, the Estonian Conservative People's Party, the Finns Party, the Christian Democratic National Peasants' Party, Electoral Action of Poles in Lithuania – Christian Families Alliance, the Freedom Party of Austria, Vox, National Rally, Vlaams Belang and the Dutch JA21, signing a document outlining new collaboration at the EU level between the parties.

In January 2022, the party participated in the Madrid summit, hosted by Vox, alongside National Rally, Law and Justice, Vlaams Belang, JA21, the Estonian Conservative People's Party, the Freedom Party of Austria, IMRO - Bulgarian National Movement, the Christian Democratic National Peasants' Party and Electoral Action of Poles in Lithuania – Christian Families Alliance, signing a joint declaration on policies towards the EU and Russia.

In November 2022, Fidesz MEPs signed a cooperation agreement with MEPs from United Poland, Vox, Lega, the Freedom Party of Austria and the National Rally to collaborate within the European Parliament.

European countries

Austria

Orbán has more recently cultivated close ties between Fidesz and the Freedom Party of Austria (FPÖ), noting "strategic cooperation" between the parties and "friendly ties based on mutual confidence and Christian-conservative values". Prior to the 2019 Austrian legislative election, he held a joint press conference with FPÖ leader Norbert Hofer, where he wished the party success in the upcoming election and stressed the "similar views" of the two parties.

Belgium

Hungarian Justice Minister Judit Varga addressed a rally in Antwerp hosted by Vlaams Belang in June 2022, alongside representatives of other Identity and Democracy Party member parties. 

Czech Republic

Orbán sent a letter of support to Václav Klaus Jr.'s newly formed Tricolour Citizens' Movement in the Czech Republic in 2019. Orbán has a relationship with Klaus's father, President Václav Klaus, who has expressed support for Orbán's rule.

During the 2021 Czech legislative election, Orbán endorsed Czech Prime Minister and ANO 2011 leader Andrej Babiš, appearing alongside him at campaign events in the Czech Republic.

Croatia

Orbán expressed strong support for Tomislav Karamarko's leadership of the Croatian Democratic Union (HDZ), having written a letter endorsing Karamarko for his stance on immigration that was read out at an HDZ rally during the 2015 Croatian parliamentary election campaign.

France

Orbán initially rejected association with Marine Le Pen's National Rally, and instead endorsed François Fillon, the candidate of The Republicans, in the 2017 French presidential election. However, in 2021, Fidesz opened relations with National Rally, congratulating Le Pen on her re-election as the party's leader.  Orbán subsequently hosted Le Pen during her October 2021 visit to Budapest and had discussions with her regarding a formal alliance between the parties. Orbán released a video of support for Le Pen during the 2022 French presidential election, which was aired at one of her campaign rallies.

Orbán also has relations with Reconquête leader Éric Zemmour, hosting him in Budapest in September 2021. 

Germany

Fidesz continues to reject cooperation with Alternative for Germany, describing the Christian Democratic Union of Germany and the Christian Social Union in Bavaria as its natural allies there.

Italy

Orbán has praised the tenure of former Italian Interior Minister Matteo Salvini, the leader of the League, declaring him an "ally and our fellow combatant in the fight for the preservation of European Christian heritage and the tackling of migration" after Salvini's departure from the Italian government in August 2019. Orbán previously urged closer political ties between the EPP and the League, and cooperated extensively on immigration with Salvini, describing Salvini as "my hero". Orbán has also fostered ties with Brothers of Italy leader Giorgia Meloni.

North Macedonia

Orbán has also fostered close political ties with right-wing Internal Macedonian Revolutionary Organization – Democratic Party for Macedonian National Unity (VMRO-DPMNE) politician and former PM Nikola Gruevski. While awaiting a ruling on an appeal to a corruption conviction in early 2019, Gruevski fled to Hungary to evade a looming jail sentence. The whereabouts of Gruevski were revealed only 4 days after he failed to report to serve his prison sentence. North Macedonian officials have suggested that Gruevski (for whom an international arrest warrant had been issued) was in contact with Hungarian officials in the days preceding his flight, and North Macedonian authorities have launched an investigation into whether Gruevski was transported across the border in a Hungarian diplomatic vehicle. The Hungarian government denied accusations of impropriety. Hungarian businesspeople close to Orbán that had previously invested into Slovenian right-wing media also entered into ownership of North Macedonian right-wing media companies, propping up outlets friendly to Gruevski and his party.

Poland

Prior to the 2019 European Parliament election, Fidesz announced it would discuss an alliance with Poland's Law and Justice (PiS) party if it leaves the EPP. The two nations' conservative governments have shared a close friendship and alliance for multiple years and the Polish government has pledged political support for Hungary within the EU. Orbán and PiS leader Jarosław Kaczyński have vowed to wage a "cultural counter-revolution" within the EU together, with the Polish government seeing Hungary under Fidesz as a model for Poland.

Serbia

Orbán has a warm relationship with Serbian President Aleksandar Vučić and his Serbian Progressive Party (SNS), with the Hungarian Foreign Minister campaigning for Vučić before the 2017 Serbian presidential election. Companies close to the Orbán government have won public contracts with the Serbian government. The Serbian government has also been accused of taking a similar approach to the Hungarian government towards the media.

Slovenia

Orbán has allied closely with Slovenian PM Janez Janša and the right-wing Slovenian Democratic Party (SDS) he heads, going so far as to campaign for SDS during the 2018 Slovenian parliamentary election. Businesspeople close to Orbán also provided funds to SDS-affiliated media companies that then also used some of the funds to purchase campaign ads on behalf of SDS to circumvent Slovenian campaign finance laws. After the election, and while SDS was struggling to secure political support to form a coalition government, Janša again met with Orbán on a private visit to Budapest; during the meeting, Orbán also conducted a conference call with US president Trump with Janša joining in. SDS's unconditional backing of Fidesz within the EPP was reportedly pivotal in preventing Fidesz's expulsion from EPP, resulting in a more lenient suspension. In a letter to EPP leader, Janša warned of an "inevitable" split in the EPP if the vote to expel Fidesz were to take place.

Other

Orbán has also developed ties with Dutch Party for Freedom (PVV) leader Geert Wilders, Vox leader Santiago Abascal, Estonian Conservative People's Party leader Mart Helme and the Portuguese Chega.

Hungarian national minority parties

Some political parties of Hungarian minorities are said to be allies of the Fidesz like the Slovak Party of the Hungarian Community (MKP), the Serbian Alliance of Vojvodina Hungarians (VMSZ), the Ukrainian KMKSZ – Hungarian Party in Ukraine, and Hungarian Democratic Party in Ukraine (UMDP), the Slovenian Hungarian National Self-Government Association of Prekmurje (MMNÖK), the Romanian Democratic Alliance of Hungarians in Romania (RMDSZ), the Hungarian Civic Party (MPP) and the Hungarian People's Party of Transylvania (EMNP). The Fidesz, the RMDSZ, MKP, VMSZ the Democratic Union of Hungarians of Croatia (HMDK) and the Democratic Party of Vojvodina Hungarians (VMDP) support each other in the 2019 European Parliament election. The MKP, VMSZ and RMDSZ are members or associates of the EPP.

Non-European countries

Israel

Orbán and his government have also fostered close ties with the Israeli Likud government under Benjamin Netanyahu, with the two heads of government forging a cordial relationship, having known one another for decades. Netanyahu advised Orbán on economic reforms conducted by the Hungarian government in the early 2000s. Netanyahu later extended public political support to Orbán at a time when Orbán was confronting criticism for praising Miklós Horthy, Hungary's former leader, whose government passed anti-Jewish legislation and collaborated with Nazi Germany, and for allegedly employing anti-Semitic tropes in his criticism of George Soros. The Israeli foreign ministry issued a statement condemning Soros in a show of solidarity with the Orbán government. A Likud lawmaker also introduced legislation modeled on Fidesz's "Stop Soros law" in the Israeli Knesset.

United States of America

Orbán and his government have gained favour with US president Donald Trump and his Republican administration (in stark contrast to the policy of isolation practiced by the preceding Obama Administration). Orbán was the first European head of government to endorse Trump's presidential bid during the 2016 United States presidential election. Trump has praised Hungary's anti-immigrant policies in a discussion with Orbán. The more amiable attitude of the Trump Administration toward the Hungarian government prompted criticism and a protest by 22 Democratic Party lawmakers that called for a more disciplinary policy towards the country's government over what they perceived as a problematic track record. Steve Bannon, former head of Breitbart News a former close associate of President Trump who had an integral role in Trump's electoral campaign and administration, has also praised Orbán and announced plans to work with Fidesz in orchestrating the party's electoral campaign for the 2019 European parliament election.

Criticism and controversies 

Fidesz has been accused of exhibiting anti-democratic and authoritarian tendencies while in government. The Fidesz-led government has been accused of severely restricting media freedom, undermining the independence of the courts, subjugating and politicising independent and non-governmental institutions, spying on political opponents, engaging in electoral engineering, and assailing critical NGOs. The Fidesz-led government has been accused of engaging in cronyism and corruption. Fidesz has been accused of antisemitism, and the Fidesz-led government has been accused of passing legislation that violates the rights of LGBT persons. Due to its controversial actions, Fidesz and its government have come in conflict with the EU on multiple occasions.

Leaders

Electoral results

National Assembly

European Parliament

1 Joint list with Christian Democratic People's Party (KDNP)

References

External links

 Fidesz – Hungarian Civic Union Official website
 Fidesz page on the website of the European People's Party
 Speech delivered by Mr Viktor Orban at the 17th Congress of Fidesz upon his election as president of Fidesz – Hungarian Civic Union, 17 May 2003 (from Google's cache)
 The History of Fidesz (from Google's cache)
 Hungary's PM calls confidence vote

 
1988 establishments in Hungary
Anti-communist parties
Anti-immigration politics in Europe
Christian democratic parties in Hungary
Conservative parties in Hungary
Eurosceptic parties in Hungary
International Democrat Union member parties
Member parties of the European People's Party
National conservative parties
Parties represented in the European Parliament
Political parties established in 1988
Political parties in Hungary
Right-wing populism in Europe
Right-wing populism in Hungary
Right-wing populist parties
Social conservative parties